Cesano Maderno-Groane railway station is a railway station in Italy. Located on the Saronno–Seregno railway, it serves the municipality of Cesano Maderno, and particularly the Groane Park.

Services 
Cesano Maderno-Groane is served by line S9 of the Milan suburban railway network, operated by the Lombard railway company Trenord.

See also 
Milan suburban railway network

References 

Railway stations in Lombardy
Milan S Lines stations
Railway stations opened in 2013